Cuninidae is a family of hydrozoans in the order Narcomedusae. They have dome-shaped bells and tentacles set above the undulating margin of the bell. Their gastric pouches contain the gonads situated in line with the tentacles, the number of pouches being the same as the number of tentacles. The pouches do not extend below the points of origin of the primary tentacles. Members of some genera have a peripheral canal system and others do not. No radial canals or secondary tentacles are present.

Systematics
The World Register of Marine Species lists the following taxa:
 Genus Cunina Eschscholtz, 1829
Cunina becki Bouillon, 1985
Cunina discoides Fewkes, 1881
Cunina duplicata Maas, 1893
Cunina fowleri (Browne, 1906)
Cunina frugifera Kramp, 1948
Cunina globosa Eschscholtz, 1829
Cunina octonaria McCrady, 1857
Cunina peregrina Bigelow, 1909
Cunina proboscidea E. & L. Metschnikoff, 1871
Cunina simplex Gili, Bouillon, Pagès, Palanques, Puig & Heussner, 1998
Cunina tenella (Bigelow, 1909)
Genus Sigiweddellia Bouillon, Pagès & Gili, 2001
Sigiweddellia benthopelagica Bouillon, Pagès & Gili, 2001
Genus Solmissus
Solmissus albescens (Gegenbaur, 1856)
Solmissus incisa (Fewkes, 1886)
Solmissus marshalli Agassiz & Mayer, 1902

References

 
Narcomedusae
Cnidarian families